Riverside College, Inc., also referred to by its acronym RCI, is a private non-sectarian coeducational higher education institution in Bacolod, Negros Occidental, Philippines. The college is owned and operated by Metro Pacific Hospital Holdings, Inc. It is notable for being the first school affiliated with a teaching hospital in Bacolod City. It offers education programs from senior high school up to graduate school.

History
Pablo O. Torre, Sr., a doctor, began his practice in a family clinic in Bacolod. The clinic expanded, later becoming the Riverside General Hospital, and Torre invited Carmelite nuns to assist in administering the facility. Four nuns joined the hospital in 1957 – Mother Superior Margaret Theresa and Sisters Regina Javier, Maria Isabelle Gregorio and Cristina Dean. Recognizing the need for competent staff to run the hospital, Torre established Riverside College, initially offering the School of Midwifery on June 11, 1961, and the School of Nursing on June 23, 1963. Riverside General Hospital became a teaching hospital for nurses.

In 1972, the hospital was renamed to Riverside Medical Center. Later, it was again renamed after its founder, becoming the Dr. Pablo O. Torre Memorial Hospital, albeit the name of its parent company retained its name as The Riverside Medical Center, Inc. Riverside College, Inc. has also retained its name in reference to the hospital's original name.

Both The Riverside Medical Center, Inc. and Riverside College, Inc. are operated and managed by Metro Pacific Hospital Holdings, Inc.

See also
List of tertiary schools in Bacolod

External links

References

Educational institutions established in 1954
Universities and colleges in Bacolod
1954 establishments in the Philippines